Ronald Robinson (born 22 October 1966) is an English former professional footballer who played as a defender in the Football League for Leeds United F.C., Doncaster Rovers, West Bromwich Albion, Rotherham United, Peterborough United, Exeter City, Huddersfield Town and Scarborough.

References

External links
 
 

1966 births
Living people
Footballers from Sunderland
English footballers
Association football defenders
Ipswich Town F.C. players
Leeds United F.C. players
Doncaster Rovers F.C. players
West Bromwich Albion F.C. players
Rotherham United F.C. players
Peterborough United F.C. players
Exeter City F.C. players
Huddersfield Town A.F.C. players
Scarborough F.C. players
Spennymoor United F.C. players
English Football League players